The 1997 Arizona Wildcats softball team represented the University of Arizona in the 1997 NCAA Division I softball season.  The Wildcats were coached by Mike Candrea, who led his twelfth season.  The Wildcats finished with a record of 61–5.  They played their home games at Rita Hillenbrand Memorial Stadium and competed in the Pacific-10 Conference, where they finished first with a 26–1 record.

The Wildcats were invited to the 1997 NCAA Division I softball tournament, where they swept the West Regional and then completed a run through the Women's College World Series to claim their fifth NCAA Women's College World Series Championship.

Roster

Schedule

Ranking movements

References

Arizona
Arizona Wildcats softball seasons
Arizona Softball
Women's College World Series seasons
NCAA Division I softball tournament seasons
Pac-12 Conference softball champion seasons